Jacques Yver, seigneur de la Bigoterie and de Plaisance (c.1548 – 1571/72) was a French writer of the Renaissance. His posthumous collection of tales mixed with verse, Le Printemps, enjoyed an important publishing success, with 33 editions published from 1572 to 1635.

Biography
Yver was born in Niort. His titles come from two small fiefs on the Sèvre river, near Niort. He went to school in Poitiers where he studied law and frequented the literary circles of the day. After trips to Italy and, perhaps, to the Rhine region, he returned home to find the region torn by the French Wars of Religion and appears to have joined the party of the "politiques".

He appears to have been inspired by the translations of the stories of Matteo Bandello made by François de Belleforest to write his own work.

(Published in Paris and Antwerp, 1572).

The work follows the frame tale technique made famous by Boccaccio's Decameron and Marguerite de Navarre's Heptameron: in a castle in Saintonge, a group of gentlemen and ladies (presented as real people, albeit under assumed names) gather together and tell each other five stories followed by debates on love. Each speaker maintains a different thesis on the nature of love and the culpability of the sexes.

Four of the tales are tragic in nature (similar to the tales of Bandello and other "" popular in the period):

The fifth tale is lighter in tone:

The work also includes verse passages, including  (Complaint on the Miseries of the Civil War).

References

External links
  Biography on the site of the Encyclopédie Larousse

16th-century French writers
16th-century male writers
Renaissance humanists
1570s deaths
1540s births
People from Niort
French male writers
French male short story writers
French short story writers